Scelidacantha is a genus of moths in the family Geometridae first described by George Duryea Hulst in 1896.

Species

References

Geometridae